The V8 Supercars China Round (formally known as the Buick V8 Supercars China Round) was a motor racing event for V8 Supercars that took place at the Shanghai International Circuit in Shanghai, China in 2005.

History

The China Round was announced, initially for a 2004 date, by series chairman Tony Cochrane in early 2003, signalling the first time that V8 Supercars would race outside Australia and New Zealand. The event was eventually confirmed for June 2005, with several teams updating their liveries for the weekend, including the HSV Dealer Team entry of Rick Kelly rebranding as Team Buick for the weekend.

The race weekend itself was dominated by the Holden Racing Team, with Todd Kelly winning two of the three races, and the round, and team-mate Mark Skaife winning the other race. It was also a record fiftieth round victory for the team. In the opening race of the weekend, Mark Winterbottom hit a loose drain cover which ripped the bottom out of the chassis and ruled him out for the final two races. It was an incident which was later repeated at the 2005 Chinese Grand Prix. 

While the event initially appeared on the 2006 calendar, the proposed dates were rejected by Chinese officials and the event was replaced by a round at Winton Motor Raceway. The 2006 calendar also featured another the series' second venture outside Australasia with the introduction of the Desert 400 in Bahrain.

Winners

Event sponsors
 2005: Buick

See also
 List of Australian Touring Car Championship races

References

V8 Supercars
China
V8 Supercars